Phillip Rogaway is a professor of computer science at the University of California, Davis.  He graduated from Beverly Hills High School, and later earned a BA in computer science from UC Berkeley and completed his PhD in cryptography at MIT, in the Theory of Computation group.  He has taught at UC Davis since 1994. He was awarded the Paris Kanellakis Award in 2009 and the first Levchin Prize for Real World Cryptography in 2016.  Rogaway received an NSF CAREER award in 1996, which the NSA had attempted to prevent by influencing the NSF.

He has been interviewed in multiple media outlets regarding his stance on the ethical obligations that cryptographers and computer scientists have to serve to the public good, specifically in the areas of internet privacy and digital surveillance.

Rogaway's papers cover topics including:
 CMAC
 Concrete security
 DES and DES-X
 Format-preserving encryption
 OCB mode
 Random oracle model
 SEAL
 UMAC
 Zero-knowledge proofs

References

External links
 Phillip Rogaway's home page at UC Davis

American cryptographers
Living people
Public-key cryptographers
University of California, Berkeley alumni
Massachusetts Institute of Technology alumni
University of California, Davis faculty
International Association for Cryptologic Research fellows
Year of birth missing (living people)